The 2019 Women's World Ice Hockey Championships were the 21st such series of tournaments organised by the International Ice Hockey Federation. Teams participated at several levels of competition. The competition also served as qualifications for the 2020 competition.

Championship (Top Division)

The Top Division tournament was played in Espoo, Finland, from 4 to 14 April 2019, and for the first time had ten nations participating.

Division I

Division I Group A
The Division I Group A tournament was played in Budapest, Hungary, from 7 to 13 April 2019.

Division I Group B
The Division I Group B tournament was played in Beijing, China, from 6 to 12 April 2019.

Division II

Division II Group A
The Division II Group A tournament was played in Dumfries, Great Britain, from 2 to 8 April 2019.

Division II Group B
The Division II Group B tournament was played in Brașov, Romania, from 1 to 7 April 2019.

Division II Group B Qualification
The Division II Group B Qualification tournament was played in Cape Town, South Africa, from 13 to 18 January 2019.

References

External links
Official website of IIHF

 
World Ice Hockey Championships - Women's
IIHF Women's World Ice Hockey Championships